D512 is a state road connecting Makarska and Ravča on D62 state road, near A1 motorway Ravča interchange.

The road serves as a connecting road to the A1 motorway for Makarska, Tučepi, Podgora and Drvenik.

The road, as well as all other state roads in Croatia, is managed and maintained by Hrvatske ceste, state owned company.

Traffic volume 

Traffic is regularly counted and reported by Hrvatske ceste, operator of the road. Substantial variations between annual (AADT) and summer (ASDT) traffic volumes are attributed to the fact that the road serves as a connection to the A1 motorway and the D8 state road carrying substantial tourist traffic.

Road junctions and populated areas

Sources

State roads in Croatia
Transport in Split-Dalmatia County